The Cockburn Islands are an island group located in Coronation Gulf, south of Victoria Island, west of the Kent Peninsula, in the Kitikmeot Region, Nunavut, Canada. Other island groups in the vicinity include the Breakwater Islands, Cheere Islands, Piercey Islands, Porden Islands, Stockport Islands, Triple Islands, and Wilmot Islands.

References 

 Cockburn Islands at the Atlas of Canada

Islands of Coronation Gulf
Uninhabited islands of Kitikmeot Region